Pittsburg is an unincorporated community in Tippecanoe Township, Carroll County, Indiana. It is part of the Lafayette, Indiana Metropolitan Statistical Area.

History
Pittsburg was laid out in 1836. A post office was established at Pittsburg in 1838, and remained in operation until it was discontinued in 1915. The name of the post office was officially spelled Pittsburgh until 1894.

It was likely named after Pittsburgh, Pennsylvania.

Geography
U.S. Route 421/State Road 39 passes through town on Monroe Street.

References

Unincorporated communities in Carroll County, Indiana
Lafayette metropolitan area, Indiana
Unincorporated communities in Indiana
1836 establishments in Indiana
Populated places established in 1836